Velimir Škorpik (April 2, 1919 – November 7, 1943) was a Croatian and Yugoslav Partisan commander, best known for his role in development of the Yugoslav Partisan navy after the invasion of Yugoslavia in April 1941.

Škorpik was born in Zadar, and in 1940 he had finished the Royal Yugoslav Naval School.  After the collapse of the Yugoslavia, he became an officer in regular forces of the Independent State of Croatia. He was stationed in Makarska where in 1941 he got in touch with local resistance movement, led by the local Communist Party of Yugoslavia cell.  He secretly became a member of the Party.

In December 1942, under Communist Party orders, Škorpik defected from the forces of the newly formed Independent State of Croatia (NDH) and joined the Partisans.  He became the head of Naval Section within 4th Operative Zone of Supreme Headquarters of Croatia.  Later Škorpik commanded 1st Naval Detachment, using his training to help the Partisans use their small boats as efficient fighting force.  After that he became commander of the Biokovo Partisan Detachment.

When Italy capitulated in September 1943, the Partisans liberated Split and Škorpik became the commandant of the naval base there. When the Germans launched an offensive on Partisan-controlled Dalmatia, he organised a successful evacuation of Partisan forces and civilians to the islands and to Allied-controlled Italy.

After the evacuation he became the chief of staff of the 3rd Dalmatian Brigade of the Yugoslav National Liberation Army (YNLA). He died fighting the Ustashas in Zagora, near Mostar.

After the war he received the title of People's Hero of Yugoslavia.

Velimir Škorpik has an arterial road named after him in the Jankomir neighborhood of Zagreb.

References

1919 births
1943 deaths
Yugoslav Partisans members
Recipients of the Order of the People's Hero
People from Zadar